Ghawre Bairey Aaj is a Bengali political drama film directed by Aparna Sen. The film starring Jisshu Sengupta, Anirban Bhattacharya and Anjan Dutt, released on 15 November 2019 under the banner of Shree Venkatesh Films. It is the modern retelling of Ghare Bairey, 1916 classic novel of Rabindranath Tagore.

Ghawre Bairey Aaj is the story of three protagonists, one of which is loosely based on slain journalist Gauri Lankesh. It was world premiered in 10th edition of Jagran Film Festival in Delhi on 18 July 2019, under the Indian Panorama category.

Plot 
It is a complex triangular love story of a Hindu nationalist professor, young Dalit girl and her liberal editor husband. The film set on the present political turbulence in country. Sandip, an active politician was a childhood friend of Nikhilesh. Nikhilesh, the editor lives with his wife Brinda. After a long time Sandip comes to meet them which causes a serious change of relationship perceptions and increases complexities between husband and wife.

Cast 
 Jisshu Sengupta as Sandip Jha
 Anirban Bhattacharya as Nikhilesh
 Tuhina Das as Brinda
 Anjan Dutt
Rwitobroto Mukherjee as Amulyo Dutta
 Sreenanda Shankar

Soundtrack

Release 
It had its world premiered in 10th edition of Jagran Film Festival in Delhi on 18 July 2019, under the Indian Panorama category.

References

External links

Bengali-language Indian films
2010s Bengali-language films
2010s political drama films
Indian political drama films
Films directed by Aparna Sen
2019 drama films
2019 films